Milaga is a 2010 Indian Tamil-language action film directed by Ravi Mariya. The film stars himself in a negative role while Natarajan Subramaniam plays the main role with Poongodi playing the heroine. The film was released on 25 June 2010 to mixed reviews but it was a moderate success.

Plot
The film revolves around Azhagar (Natarajan Subramaniam), who takes care of the family’s red chilli business. But he spends most of the time with his friends and leads a happy life until he comes across three brothers who control Madurai.

He earns the wrath of the evil brothers while trying to save a girl called Thenmozhi (Poongothai). The story focuses on him defeating the brothers and winning over Thenmozhi.

Cast

Production
"Milaga" was Ravi Mariya's second directorial after Aasai Aasaiyai (2002). Directors Singam Puli, Jegannath, Nanda Periyasamy and G. M. Kumar don the grease paint for playing the major characters in the movie.

The crew had imported a Mumbai item girl named Maushmi Udeshi to shake her legs for the song. Suddenly when the crew was unaware, a man jumped out from the crowd, hugged Maushmi and kissed her. Shocked by this, the girl had thrashed the man furiously and made him unconscious. Awed by the actress wildness and the condition of the man, the crew had carried him to the hospital.

The shooting of this film commenced in Madurai and continued in Theni, Kambam, Kodaikanal and Thiruparakundram. The shooting took place for 60 days without a single day break. An enormous Karupanna Samy temple set was erected by art director Vasuki G P at the back of Thiruparakundram hills. A festival song sequence was shot in this set.

Soundtrack
Soundtrack was composed by Sabesh–Murali.
"Thavaniyellam" - Balaji
"Nee Sirichupaakura" - Krishnaraj, Ganga
"Kirukku Paiya" - Sathyan, Prashanthini
"Enga Vandhadi" - Janani, Vineeth, Geetha
"Samy Vandhuruchu" - Sriram, Sabesh

Critical reception
Indiaglitz wrote that director is "only partially successful in striking a perfect balance. Despite being racy, the film somehow fails to work big time, thanks to predictable scenes, especially in the second half". Sify wrote "first half of the film moves at a rapid pace [sic] it is the predictable second half of the film which hampers the pace". Rediff wrote that "movie doesn't quite capitalise on strengths". Behindwoods wrote "There is no doubt about what the makers of Milaka have envisioned: nothing ground breaking or novel, but a fairly enjoyable commercial ride through Madurai which has its share of uniqueness, clichés and stereotypes in equal measure".

References

External links
 

2010 films
Films set in Tamil Nadu
Films shot in Madurai
Films shot in Kodaikanal
2010s Tamil-language films
2010 masala films
2010 action comedy films
Indian action comedy films